L14 or L-14 may refer to:

Vehicles
Aircraft
 Daimler L14, a German fighter
 Lockheed L-14 Super Electra, an American passenger aircraft
 Piper L-14, an American military aircraft
 L-14, an L-class blimp of the United States Navy

Ships
 , a submarine of the Royal Navy
 , an amphibious assault ship of the Royal Navy
 , a destroyer of the Royal Navy
 , an amphibious warfare vessel of the Indian Navy
 , a Leninets-class submarine

Other uses
 L14 (New York City bus)
 60S ribosomal protein L14
 County Road L14 (Lyon County, Iowa)
 Lectionary 14, a 16th-century, Greek manuscript of the New Testament 
 Nissan L14 engine, an automobile engine